The 014 Construction Unit is an engineering unit of the Armed Forces of Mongolia.

History 
It was established in 1944. The unit fought during World War Two and took part in the Soviet invasion of Manchuria in 1945. It was also part of the Fourth Cavalry Committee serving on the western border of Mongolia in 1947. It successfully participated in joint field exercises orchestrated by the Mongolian People's Army (examples including Kherlen-73 and Govi-77) as well as joint Mongolian-Soviet exercises in 1973 and 1977. It fulfilled the Army Leader Class status for units for seven consecutive years from 1973 to 1980. In 2017, the unit was awarded the Order of the Red Banner of Merit.

Activities 
It takes part in peace-building construction in Ulaanbaatar and serves as a war-time construction unit. It has taken part in projects such as the building of factories, power plants, a student office, and a 72-room apartment for officers.

Like, many military units, it maintains a military band that serves as a public relations tool.

See also 

 United States Army Corps of Engineers
 Canadian Military Engineers
 Madras Engineer Group
 Royal Engineers

References 

Military units and formations of Mongolia
1944 establishments in Mongolia
Military units and formations established in 1944